Ravnica is a block of the trading card game Magic: The Gathering

Ravnica may also refer to:

 Ravnica, Prozor, a village in the Municipality of Prozor, Bosnia and Herzegovina
 Ravnica, Radovljica, a settlement in the Municipality of Radovljica in the Upper Carniola region of Slovenia
 Ravnica, Nova Gorica, a village in the Municipality of Nova Goricain western Slovenia

See also
Return to Ravnica, a further block of Magic: The Gathering
Ravanica (disambiguation)